Stock car racing events in the NASCAR Xfinity Series has been held at the Auto Club Speedway in Fontana, California since the track's inauguration in 1997. The 300-mile (480 km) event is currently named Production Alliance Group 300 for sponsorship reasons since 2019. The race is usually scheduled in late March as the fifth event of the schedule and as a support event for the NASCAR Cup Series' Auto Club 400. It has previously been held in October and late April or early May. John Hunter Nemechek is the defending winner of the event, after winning it in 2023.

A second race at the track was also held during the fall as support to the Cup fall race from 2004 until the track lost its second Cup date after 2010.

Past winners

Notes
2008 I: Race postponed from Saturday night to Monday afternoon due to rain.
2009 II, 2010 I and 2022: Race extended due to NASCAR overtime.
2021: Race canceled and moved to the Daytona road course due to the COVID-19 pandemic.
2023: Race postponed from Saturday afternoon to Sunday night due to rain.

Multiple winners

Drivers

Teams

Manufacturer wins

References

External links
 

1997 establishments in California
NASCAR Xfinity Series races
NASCAR races at Auto Club Speedway
Recurring sporting events established in 1997
Annual sporting events in the United States